Gautam Padmanabhan is an Indian publishing executive. He is the CEO of Westland Books, the fifth-largest English language publisher in India.

References 

Living people
Indian book publishers (people)
Year of birth missing (living people)